Knife for the Ladies is a 1974 American Western horror film directed by Larry G. Spangler and starring Jack Elam, Ruth Roman and Gene Evans. It was the first production from the company Bryanston Pictures.

Plot
A private detective, Burns, is hired to travel out west to an Arizona town to investigate the murders of several prostitutes, each killed with a knife. The town has already lynched a local horse trader for the murders on the word of a small boy, Seth. Once there he meets a disgraced "two-fisted" sheriff, a sullen undertaker, and the local heiress. After proving the trader was innocent, Burns comes to terms with the sheriff, and they begin to work together. A number of subplots ensue: Burns and the sheriff shoot the man responsible for the lynching, the mortician blackmails the heiress to preserve her secret, and they discover that the heiress is using her arsenic to treat syphilis. The main plot is resolved with a surprise reveal, and Burns, the Sheriff, and his niece Jenny leave town on the next stagecoach out of town.

Cast
Jack Elam as Sheriff Jarrod
Ruth Roman as Elizabeth
Jeff Cooper as Burns
John Kellogg as Hollyfield
Gene Evans as Hooker
Diana Ewing as Jenny
Derek Sanderson as Lute
Jon Spangler as Seth

Reception

James Evans from Starburst magazine rated the film four out of ten stars writing, "A Knife for the Ladies isn’t a great western nor is it a good horror movie but it has its charms."

References

External links
 
 
 
 

1974 films
1974 horror films
1974 independent films
1970s serial killer films
1970s Western (genre) horror films
American independent films
American serial killer films
American Western (genre) horror films
American detective films
1970s English-language films
1970s American films